Secret Origins, may refer to:

 Secret Origins, a number of series and stories from DC Comics
 Secret Files and Origins, the DC Comics title that continued the kinds of story feature in the original
 "Secret Origins" (Teenage Mutant Ninja Turtles (2003 TV series)), an episode of the Teenage Mutant Ninja Turtles animated TV series
 "Secret Origins" (Justice League), the first of the three-parter Justice League TV series premiere that originally aired in 2001 as a television film without the Secret Origins title
 Secret Origins (audio drama), a Doctor Who spin-off audio play